Dead Lakes State Recreation Area is a Florida protected area located  north of Wewahitchka off Florida State Road 71 and southwest of Tallahassee. It was formerly a Florida State Park and originally a fish hatchery operated by the Florida Fish and Wildlife Conservation Commission from 1936 until 1951. Activities include hiking, fishing, boating, camping, and wildlife viewing. Among the wildlife of the park are foxes, cotton rats, raccoons, opossums, white-tailed deer, rabbits, skunk, beavers, turtles, snakes and alligators. A variety of trees can be found in the park, including longleaf pine, magnolia and bald cypress trees. Amenities include a boat ramp, fresh water trails, nature trails, and a camping area. The recreation area is open from 8:00 am until sunset year-round.

References

ACF River Basin
State parks of Florida
Parks in Gulf County, Florida